Wallace David Maxwell (born August 24, 1933) is a Canadian professional ice hockey player who played two games in the National Hockey League.  He played with the Toronto Maple Leafs during the 1952–53 season. He also played on the 1955–56 Michigan Wolverines men's ice hockey team that won the 1956 NCAA Division I Men's Ice Hockey Tournament.

Career statistics

Regular season and playoffs

External links
 

1933 births
Living people
Canadian ice hockey centres
Ice hockey people from Ottawa
Michigan Wolverines men's ice hockey players
NCAA men's ice hockey national champions
Ontario Hockey Association Senior A League (1890–1979) players
Toledo Mercurys players
Toronto Maple Leafs players
Toronto Marlboros players